"Down to Earth" is a song by English band Curiosity Killed the Cat, released in November 1986 by Mercury Records as the second single from their debut album Keep Your Distance. It was the band's biggest hit, peaking at number 3 on the UK Singles Chart.

After the lack of success with "Misfit" when it was first released 4 months earlier, the record company wanted to release another single. However, the record company wanted to release it after the Christmas period as they believed the song wouldn't survive the Christmas rush. Curiosity insisted on releasing "Down to Earth" before and so it was released in November and it slowly moved up the charts until it spent three weeks at number 3 in February 1987.

Track listings 
7": Mercury / CAT 2 (UK)

 "Down to Earth" – 3:48
 "Down to Earth" (Instrumental) – 3:48

12": Mercury / CATX 2 (UK)

 "Down to Earth" (Extended Mix) – 6:00
 "Shallow Memory" –  4:28
 "Down to Earth" (Instrumental) – 3:48

Double 12": Mercury / CATXD 2 (UK)

 "Down to Earth" (Extended Mix
 "Shallow Memory"
 "Down to Earth" (Instrumental)
"Misfit" (John Morales Extended Mix)

CDV: Mercury / 080 100-2 (UK; released in 1987)

 "Down to Earth" (Extended Mix)
 "Mile High"
 "Know What You Know"
 "Down to Earth" (Video)

Charts

Weekly charts

Year-end charts

References 

1986 singles
Song recordings produced by Stewart Levine
Mercury Records singles
1986 songs